The 2018 BinckBank Tour was a road cycling stage race that took place between 13 and 19 August 2018 in Belgium and the Netherlands. It was the 14th edition of the BinckBank Tour and the twenty-ninth event of the 2018 UCI World Tour. The stage race was won by the Slovenian Matej Mohorič.

Teams
All UCI WorldTeam were invited as the race is part of the UCI World Tour. The race organisation also gave out wildcards to five UCI Professional Continental teams.

Schedule
The course for the race was announced in February 2018.

Stages

Stage 1
13 August 2018 – Heerenveen to Bolsward,

Stage 2
14 August 2018 – Venray, individual time trial (ITT)

Stage 3
15 August 2018 – Aalter to Antwerp,

Stage 4
16 August 2018 – Blankenberge to Ardooie,

Stage 5
17 August 2018 – Sint-Pieters-Leeuw to Lanaken,

Stage 6
18 August 2018 – Riemst to Sittard-Geleen,

Stage 7
19 August 2018 – Eau d'Heure lakes to Geraardsbergen,

Classification leadership table
There are four principal classifications in the race. The first of these is the general classification, calculated by adding up the time each rider took to ride each stage. Time bonuses are applied for winning stages (10, 6 and 4 seconds to the first three riders) and for the three "golden kilometre" sprints on each stage. At each of these sprints, the first three riders are given 3-, 2- and 1-second bonuses respectively. The rider with the lowest cumulative time is the winner of the general classification. The rider leading the classification wins a green jersey.

There is also a points classification. On each road stage the riders are awarded points for finishing in the top 10 places, with other points awarded for intermediate sprints. The rider with the most accumulated points is the leader of the classification and wins the red jersey. The combativity classification is based solely on points won at the intermediate sprints; the leading rider wins the black jersey. The final classification is a team classification: on each stage the times of the best three riders on each team are added up. The team with the lowest cumulative time over the seven stages wins the team classification.

References

2018 UCI World Tour
2018 in Belgian sport
2018 in Dutch sport
2018
August 2018 sports events in Europe